Little Smeaton is a hamlet and civil parish in the Hambleton district of North Yorkshire, England.

Etymology
The name of Little Smeaton is first attested in the Domesday Book of 1086 as Smidetun, Smidetune, and Smitune. The first attestation of the 'little' element is found two years later in the phrase 'in litle Smithetun' in the Durham Liber Vitae; this element distinguishes Little Smeaton from the neighbouring Great Smeaton. The name comes from the Old English words smiþ ('craftsman, smith') in its genitive plural form smiþa and tūn ('estate, village'). Thus the name once meant 'smiths' estate'.

References

External links

Civil parishes in North Yorkshire
Hambleton District
Hamlets in North Yorkshire